Sta-Prest (a stylized rendering of "stay pressed") is a brand of wrinkle-resistant trousers produced by Levi Strauss & Co., beginning in 1964.

Sta-Prest jeans are marketed as being wearable straight out of the dryer, with no need for ironing. The trousers were especially popular among British mods of the mid 1960s and skinheads of the late 1960s (as well as among traditionalist skinheads and mod revivalists of later decades). Vintage pairs of Sta-Prest trousers have become collector's items. Other companies, such as Lee and Wrangler, produced similar styles of trousers during that same period. Lee's version was called Lee Prest, which came in similar colors and patterns as Sta-Prest; although they were much slimmer and tapered. Decades later, Merc started marketing a brand called Sta Press.

When the skinhead scene hit America in the 1980s Levi's Sta-prest were not always an affordable option, and slim fit Dickies work pants were worn. Dickies gave the same look and style, and since they were made for work wear they did not lose their crease, and could be worn without ironing.

External links
Levi's - Our Company - History & Heritage
Sta Press on Merc website

1960s fashion
Trousers and shorts